After Midnight with Boston Blackie is a 1943 crime film directed by Lew Landers. It is the fifth of a series of 14 Columbia Pictures films starring Chester Morris as Boston Blackie. When a recently paroled friend of Boston Blackie is killed, he finds himself once again the prime suspect of Police Inspector Farraday.

Plot
When "Diamond" Ed Barnaby (an uncredited Walter Baldwin) is paroled, he sets out to give $100,000 worth of diamonds to his daughter, Betty (Ann Savage). Aware that several shady characters know he has the jewels, he stashes them in a safe deposit box in the Arcade Building. Betty later receives a call asking her to meet him there, but he never shows up. She contacts her father's only real friend: Horatio Black, better known as Boston Blackie. He agrees to help and drops Betty off at the apartment of his wealthy friend, Arthur Manleder (Lloyd Corrigan), for safekeeping. His sidekick, "the Runt" (George E. Stone), has to postpone his wedding to statuesque bubble dancer Dixy Rose Blossom (Jan Buckingham).

Blackie discovers which deposit box Barnaby rented. Meanwhile, crooks Joe Herschel, Sammy Walsh and Marty Beck (Cy Kendall, Al Hill and George McKay respectively, all uncredited), force their prisoner, Ed Barnaby, to reveal where he hid the diamonds. When the trio leave, Barnaby manages to telephones the police, but is killed by Herschel. Inspector Farraday (Richard Lane) learns enough from the call to rush over to the Arcade Building with Sergeant Mathews (Walter Sande, uncredited). He apprehends Blackie on suspicion of murdering Barnaby just as he is about to open the box. The box turns out to be empty.

Blackie manages to escape. When he returns to Manleder's apartment, he finds that Betty has been kidnapped. A note offers to exchange her for the diamonds. Blackie has the Runt "borrow" a brooch from Dixy, and pries off the fake diamonds.

He then heads to the Flamingo Club, run by Herschel and his associates. Slipping inside undetected, he spies through the keyhole of the door to Herschel's office and sees the crook put the diamonds in his safe. After Herschel leaves, Blackie enters, cracks the safe and takes the jewels. However, before he can leave, Walsh and Beck enter. Thinking quickly, Blackie drops the diamonds in a pitcher of water. Unaware that Herschel double crossed them and had the real diamonds, Walsh and Beck exchange Betty for the fakes. Herschel returns too soon and exposes the fakes, but Blackie and Betty eventually manage to escape, aided by a citywide wartime practice blackout.

Walsh figures out that Herschel is out for himself. When he cannot produce the diamonds, Herschel is shot and killed by Walsh. Blackie returns to retrieve the stones, and witnesses the murder. Afterward, he offers to give the jewels to Walsh for the location of Barnaby's body. When the police close in, the pair sneak out and steal Inspector Farraday's car. Blackie sets the radio to "send" without Walsh noticing, then gets him to confess all with the police listening in. Eventually, Blackie is able to turn the tables and turn Walsh over to the authorities.

The Runt's wedding is interrupted once more, this time by Farraday and Mathews when they arrest Dixy for bigamy.

Cast
 Chester Morris as Horatio "Boston Blackie" Black
 Richard Lane as Inspector Farraday
 Ann Savage as Betty Barnaby
 George E. Stone as The Runt
 Lloyd Corrigan as Arthur Manleder
 Walter Baldwin as Diamond Ed Barnaby
 Don Barclay as Cigar Clerk
 Jan Buckingham as Dixie Rose Blossom
 Eddy Chandler as Police Captain
 Heinie Conklin as Workman
 Dudley Dickerson as Bullfiddle Player
 Dick Elliott as Justice of Peace Potts
 Sam McDaniel as Train Porter (uncredited)

References

External links
 
 
 
 

American crime films
American black-and-white films
Films directed by Lew Landers
Columbia Pictures films
1943 crime films
1943 films
Films with screenplays by Aubrey Wisberg
Boston Blackie films
1940s American films